Loudon Wainwright may refer to:

Loudon Wainwright Jr. (Loudon Snowden Wainwright, 1924–1988), American writer, notably for Life magazine
Loudon Wainwright III (Loudon Snowden Wainwright, born 1946), American songwriter and folk musician, son of Loudon Wainwright Jr.
Loudon Wainwright III (album), also known as Album I, 1970

See also